The second season of the Fox television series Sleepy Hollow premiered on September 22, 2014, and concluded February 23, 2015, consisting of 18 episodes.

Cast and characters

Main cast
 Tom Mison as Ichabod Crane
 Nicole Beharie as Lt. Abigail "Abbie" Mills
 Orlando Jones as Frank Irving
 Katia Winter as Katrina Crane
 Lyndie Greenwood as Jennifer "Jenny" Mills
 John Noble as Henry Parish / Jeremy Crane

Recurring cast
 Neil Jackson, Jeremy Owens, and Craig Branham as the Headless Horseman / Abraham Van Brunt
 Matt Barr as Nick Hawley
 Derek Mears, Marti Matulis, Luke Smith, and Austin Filson as Moloch
 Sakina Jaffrey as Sheriff Leena Reyes
 Marti Matulis, Eric Marinade, and Ed Dabney as the Horseman of War

Guest cast

 Timothy Busfield as Benjamin Franklin
 Jill Marie Jones as Cynthia Irving
 Patrick Gorman as Reverend Alfred Knapp
 John Cho as Officer Andy Brooks
 Clancy Brown as Sheriff August Corbin
 Onira Tares as Grace Dixon
 Aunjanue Ellis as Lori Mills
 Laura Spencer as Caroline
 Sharif Atkins as Calvin Riggs
 Johnathon Schaech as Solomon Kent
 Zach Appelman as Joe Corbin
 Heather Lind as Mary Wells
 Francie Swift as Beth Lancaster
 Max Brown as Orion
 Jaime Murray as Carmilla Pines
 Steven Weber as Thomas Jefferson
 Michelle Trachtenberg as Abigail Adams
 Eddie Spears as Big Ash
 Cynthia Stevenson as Nurse Gina Lambert
 Chris Greene as Daniel Riggs
 Braden Fitzgerald as Young Jeremy Crane

Episodes

Ratings

References

2014 American television seasons
2015 American television seasons